|}

The Horris Hill Stakes is a Group 3 flat horse race in Great Britain open to two-year-old thoroughbred colts and geldings. It is run at Newbury over a distance of 7 furlongs (1,408 metres), and it is scheduled to take place each year in October.

History
The event is named after Horris Hill, an area located to the south of the racecourse. It was established in 1949, and was originally open to horses of either gender. The first running was won by a filly called Lone Victress.

The present system of race grading was introduced in 1971, and the Horris Hill Stakes was initially given Group 2 status. It was later relegated to Group 3 level.

The race was restricted to male horses in 1987. For a period it was held on Newbury's left-handed course, with a distance of about 7 furlongs and 64 yards. It was switched to the slightly shorter straight track in 2000.

The Horris Hill Stakes is part of the venue's last flat racing fixture of the year. From 2012 to 2016 the race was run under various titles incorporating Worthington's name along with a charity, and in 2017 it was sponsored by Bathwick Tyres and run as the Bathwick Tyres Stakes. Since 2018 it has been sponsored by the Molson Beverage Company and run under sponsored titles.

Records
Leading jockey (6 wins):
 Pat Eddery – Corby (1974), State Occasion (1975), Montekin (1981), Naheez (1986), Tirol (1989), Peak to Creek (2003)

Leading trainer (4 wins):
 Richard Hannon Sr. – Tirol (1989), Umistim (1999), Carnaby Street (2009), Tell Dad (2011), Piping Rock (2013)

Winners since 1976

Earlier winners

 1949: Lone Victress
 1950: Supreme Court
 1951: H.V.C.
 1952: Baldaquin
 1953: Court Splendour
 1954: Royal Palm
 1955: Clarification
 1956: Persuader
 1957: Alcide
 1958: Seascape
 1959: Ironic
 1960: Gallant Knight
 1961: Valentine
 1962: Scholar Gypsy
 1963: Atbara
 1964: Foothill
 1965: Charlottown
 1966: Alcan
 1967: Dalry
 1968: Sentier
 1969: Double First
 1970: Good Bond
 1971: Disguise
 1972: Long Row
 1973: Welsh Harmony
 1974: Corby
 1975: State Occasion

See also
 Horse racing in Great Britain
 List of British flat horse races

References

 Paris-Turf: 

 Racing Post:

 galopp-sieger.de – Horris Hill Stakes.
 horseracingintfed.com – International Federation of Horseracing Authorities – Horris Hill Stakes (2018).
 pedigreequery.com – Horris Hill Stakes – Newbury.
 

Flat races in Great Britain
Newbury Racecourse
Flat horse races for two-year-olds
Recurring sporting events established in 1949
1949 establishments in England